Keratella is a genus of Brachionidae.

The genus was described in 1822 by Jean Baptiste Bory de Saint-Vincent.

It has cosmopolitan distribution.

Species:
 Keratella cochlearis
 Keratella hiemalis
 Keratella quadrata

References

External links

Rotifer genera
Brachionidae